Carson & Lundin (and later Carson, Lundin & Shaw) was an architectural firm in New York City formed initially by the 1941 partnership between Robert Irose Carson with Earl H. Lundin.

Principals
Robert Carson (July 19, 1906 – 1960) was born in Macon, Illinois and received his bachelor's degree in architecture from the University of Pennsylvania before coming to New York City, where he worked with Raymond Hood and was the senior architect of Rockefeller Center from 1939 until his partnership with Forsyth.
Earl H. Lundin was born in 1902 and died in 1976.

Notable buildings
Esso Building (now Time Warner Building / 75 Rockefeller Plaza in Rockefeller Center) (1947)
First National Bank Building (Tulsa) (1950)
666 Fifth Avenue (1957)
55 Public Square Cleveland (1958)
399 Park Avenue (world headquarters of Citigroup) (1961 as Carson Lundin and Shaw)
4 New York Plaza (1969)
25 Park Place, former headquarters of SunTrust, Atlanta (1971)

References

External links

Architecture firms based in New York City
Companies based in Manhattan
Design companies established in 1941
1941 establishments in New York City